The Warrick County School Corporation (WCSC) is the second largest public school-governing body in Southwestern Indiana and the 27th largest in Indiana. It is responsible for providing education to the second largest county in the area, Warrick County, Indiana.

The WCSC has two high schools, two middle schools, one junior/senior high school, and ten elementary schools. Its headquarters is located at 300 East Gum Street in Boonville, Indiana. WCSC was in one of the three Indiana counties of the Gibson-Pike-Warrick Special Education Cooperative, The others being Gibson and Pike, but now operates is special education independently.

Schools

High schools

 Plays football independently, but participates in the Pocket Athletic Conference in all other sports. Tecumseh is the smallest member of the PAC by quite a stretch.
(A) Castle: 5A in Football, 4A in all other classed sports. Boonville: 4A in football, 3A in all other classed sports.

Middle schools

Other facilities
 Southern Indiana Career & Technical Center

Neighboring school districts

Indiana
 East Gibson School Corporation
 Pike County School Corporation
 South Gibson School Corporation
 Evansville Vanderburgh School Corporation
 Southwest Dubois County School Corporation
 South Spencer School Corporation
 North Spencer School Corporation

Kentucky
 Henderson County School System
 Daviess County Public Schools

Resources
Warrick County School Corporation
WCSC Boonville High School
WCSC Castle High School
WCSC Tecumseh High School

References

School districts in Indiana
Southwestern Indiana
Education in Warrick County, Indiana
Boonville, Indiana
Newburgh, Indiana